Adetunji "Tunji" Kasim is a Scottish actor. He is best known for his role as Joe Bailey in Nearly Famous (on E4),, Hugo Scott, an art teacher in Shetland, and Ned Nickerson in The CW's Nancy Drew.

In 2009, he was nominated for an Ian Charleson Awards drama award for Julius Caesar (with the RSC).

He was born in Aberdeen but moved to Nigeria soon after being born. He was there until he was 12 and then the family moved back to Aberdeen and spent his teenage years there. He is of mixed Scottish and Nigerian heritage. His first thoughts of a career were of being a boxer or a dish washer. He then studied at the Royal Scottish Academy of Music and Drama in Glasgow, which is now called Royal Conservatoire of Scotland.

Work
 2006, Talented Mr Ripley as Reddington by Acorn Theatre Company in Aberdeen
 2007, made London stage debut in Michael Attenborough's production of Big White Fog at the Almeida theatre
 2007, Nearly Famous (series 1) as Joe Bailey
 March 2007, Young Vic theatre, The Brothers Size by Tarell Alvin McCraney, directed by Bijan Sheibani.
Nov 2008, Young Vic theatre, The Brothers Size.
2009-2011, as part of the Royal Shakespeare Company long ensemble, appearing in David Farr's King Lear (as Edmund), and The Winter’s Tale (as Florizel), Michael Boyd's Anthony and Cleopatra (as Mardian) and 'The Grain Store', Lucy Bailey's Julius Caesar, and Jamie Lloyd's American Trade (as Pharus).
2012, appearing in The Duchess of Malfi at the Old Vic theatre by Jamie Lloyd. 
April 2013, he among other actors provided voices for various Shakespeare's Sonnets to be played via a phone app.
January 2014, Orlando (as part of the Chorus) by Sarah Ruhl, at the Royal Exchange, Manchester .
March 2014, BBC One Shetland (series 2) as Hugo Scott, an art teacher.
23 September 2014 – 14 March 2015, Royal Shakespeare Company's Love's Labour's Lost as Dumaine.
2016, Eric in Les Blancs at the National Theatre
26 September 2018 - 19 January 2019, Caesar in Royal National Theatre's Simon Godwin-directed production of Antony and Cleopatra
This production was broadcast via National Theatre Live on 6 December 2018.
2019, The Good Liar film as Michael
2019–present, Nancy Drew as Ned Nickerson

References

External links

CV at the National Theatre

Male actors from Aberdeen
Living people
Scottish male film actors
Scottish male television actors
Alumni of the Royal Conservatoire of Scotland
Scottish people of Nigerian descent
1987 births
21st-century Scottish male actors